Tomas Tenconi didn't defend his 2008 title, because he was eliminated by Alexandre Sidorenko already in the first round.
Frederico Gil won in the final 2–6, 6–1, 6–4, against Potito Starace.

Seeds

Draw

Final eight

Top half

Bottom half

References
 Main Draw
 Qualifying Draw

Tennislife Cup - Singles
Tennislife Cup